Zechmeister is a surname. Notable people with the surname include:

 Alfred Zechmeister (born 1950), Austrian sprint canoer
 Barbara Zechmeister, German operatic soprano
 Christa Zechmeister (born 1957), German skier
 Elizabeth Zechmeister (born 1972), American political scientist
 Marianne Zechmeister (born 1960), German skier